{{Taxobox
| name = Marinobacterium nitratireducens
| domain = Bacteria
| phylum = Pseudomonadota
| classis = Gammaproteobacteria
| ordo = Alteromonadales
| familia = Alteromonadaceae
| genus = Marinobacterium
| species = M. nitratireducens| binomial = Marinobacterium nitratireducens| binomial_authority = Huo et al. 2009
| type_strain = CGMCC 1.7286, JCM 15523, CN44
| subdivision = 
| synonyms = 
}}Marinobacterium nitratireducens'  is a Gram-negative, strictly aerobic and non-spore-forming bacterium from the genus of Marinobacterium'' which has been isolated from sediments from the East China Sea.

References

External links
Type strain of Marinobacterium nitratireducens at BacDive -  the Bacterial Diversity Metadatabase

 

Alteromonadales
Bacteria described in 2009